John Cochran (September 1, 1730 – April 6, 1807) was the 4th Surgeon General of the United States Army during the American Revolution. He was president of the Medical Society of New Jersey from 1769 to 1770, and was re-elected in 1770 and served until 1771.

Biography
Cochran was born in Sadsbury, Chester County, Pennsylvania, on September 1, 1730, the son of Irish immigrants. He served as physician under Lieutenant-Colonel John Bradstreet during his march on Fort Frontenac in 1758. He was president of the Medical Society of New Jersey from 1769 to 1770, and was re-elected in 1770 and served until 1771.

On April 10, 1777, Cochran was made Physician & Surgeon General of the Middle Department of the Medical Department of the Continental Army. Subsequently, he became Physician and Surgeon General of the Continental Army and Director General of the Hospitals of the United States (January 17, 1781 to 1783). Because of the infighting and other troubles of his three predecessors as Surgeon General, he is considered by some military medical historians as the "best of the Revolutionary period chief physicians."

Personal life
Cochran was married to Geertruy "Gertrude" Schuyler (1724–1813), a widow who was the eldest daughter of Cornelia (née Van Cortlandt) Schuyler and Johannes Schuyler Jr., the mayor of Albany from 1740 to 1741.  Gertrude was the sister of Gen. Philip Schuyler and the widow Pieter P. Schuyler (1723–1753), her cousin and the grandson of Pieter Schuyler, with whom she had two children (Cornelia, the wife of Walter Livingston and Pieter Jr., the wife of Gertrude Lansing).  Together, Gertrude and John were the parents of:

 James Cochran (1769–1848), who married Catherine Van Rensselaer Schuyler (1781–1857), his first cousin and daughter of Philip Schuyler

He died on April 6, 1807 in Palatine, New York.

Legacy
Cochran's descendants added a final e to the family name. His grandson was Congressman, general, and New York State Attorney General John Cochrane. Cochran is buried at Forest Hill Cemetery in Utica.

References

External links

1730 births
1807 deaths
American people of Irish descent
People from Chester County, Pennsylvania
People of colonial New Jersey
People of New Jersey in the American Revolution
People of New Jersey in the French and Indian War
Physicians in the American Revolution
Surgeons General of the United States Army
Physicians from New Jersey
Presidents of the Medical Society of New Jersey
Burials at Forest Hill Cemetery (Utica, New York)